Glycol stearate (glycol monostearate or ethylene glycol monostearate) is an organic compound with the molecular formula C20H40O3.  It is the ester of stearic acid and ethylene glycol.  It is used as an ingredient in many types of personal care products and cosmetics including shampoos, hair conditioners, and skin lotions.

See also
 Glycol distearate

References

Stearate esters
Fatty acid esters
Glycol esters